The Football Federation of the Islamic Republic of Mauritania (FFRIM) is the governing body of football in Mauritania. It was founded in 1961, affiliated to FIFA in 1970 and to CAF in 1976. It organizes the national football league and the national team.

References

External links
Fédération de Football de la République Islamique de Mauritanie  
 Mauritania at FIFA site
 Mauritania at CAF Online

Mauritania
Football in Mauritania
Sports organizations established in 1961
Football